Lee Ho-seong (July 17, 1967 – March 10, 2008) was a South Korean baseball player, accused of murder of a woman and her 3 children. During his career he played for Haitai Tigers. He debuted in 1990 and stayed with the Tigers for his 12-year career until retiring in 2001. He batted .272 and had 102 home runs in his KBO career. Ho-seong was team captain in 1999 and 2000 and became president of the league's players union in 2001.

Death
Police found Lee's body in the Han River on March 10, 2008. One day later they found the bodies of a 46-year-old woman and her three children. Police suspected that Lee and the woman had been in a relationship. Lee had apparently borrowed the equivalent of $250,000. He was unable to pay the money back, and police speculated that this was the motive of the killings. Police said their details about the case were still sketchy because there was no suicide note, but Lee was seen on security video removing four large black duffel bags from the woman's apartment late one evening. He was also put at the scene by a witness who saw him in the parking lot about the time that the woman and her daughters went missing.

References

1967 births
2008 suicides
South Korean baseball players
Haitai Tigers players
Kia Tigers players
Murder–suicides in South Korea
South Korean mass murderers
South Korean murderers of children
Suicides by drowning in South Korea